GameMonkey Script is a small, cross-platform scripting language designed for embedding into games. GameMonkey bears many similarities to Lua, except the syntax is more similar to that of C.

History 
GameMonkey Script was written in 2002 by Matthew Riek and Greg Douglas as part of a closed-source project for Auran Development. However, on 12 June 2003 Auran granted license for the full source code of GameMonkey to be released to the public under the MIT License. It is currently being used in commercial and hobby applications on a wide range of machines, from the Windows PC, Apple Mac, and Microsoft Xbox to Sony's PlayStation 2, PlayStation 3, Nintendo GameCube, Nintendo DS, Nintendo Wii and various distributions of Linux.

Features 
 A cross-platform machine library
 C-style syntax
 A small memory footprint (~50 KB)
 Soft, real-time incremental garbage collection (no reference counting)
 Native threading
 Full implementation of states
 Simple binding with C++ code
 Debugger support (with supplied debugger)

Like Lua, the primary data structure in GameMonkey Script is the table. Tables allow for a variety of other data structures to be created; from arrays, sets, hashmaps, lists and records. They can also be used to simulate namespaces and C++ class structures, containing both functions and properties.

External links
 GameMonkey Script homepage
 gmCommunity Project, pre-built GM binaries and reorganised headers
 gamedev.net, Introduction to GameMonkey Script Part 1
 gamedev.net, Introduction to GameMonkey Script Part 2
 gamedev.net, Introduction to GameMonkey Script Part 3

Scripting languages
Software using the MIT license